The 2015 Men's Pan American Challenge was the second edition of the Men's Pan American Challenge. It was held between 3 and 11 October 2015 in Chiclayo, Peru, simultaneously with the women's tournament.

Brazil won the tournament for the first time after defeating Venezuela 1–0 in the final. Uruguay won the bronze medal by defeating Guyana 3–2 in a penalty shoot-out following a 2–2 draw. The top two teams also qualified for the 2017 Pan American Cup.

Participating nations
A total of eight teams competed for the title:

Results
All times are local (UTC-5).

First round

Pool A

Pool B

Second round

Fifth to eighth place classification

Crossover

Seventh and eighth place

Fifth and sixth place

First to fourth place classification

Semi-finals

Third and fourth place

Final

Final standings

See also
2015 Women's Pan American Challenge

References

Pan American Challenge
Pan American Challenge Men
Men's Pan American Challenge
Chiclayo
Pan American Challenge Men
International field hockey competitions hosted by Peru